Słupia is a river in north-western Poland, a tributary of the Baltic Sea, with a length of 138 kilometres and the basin area of 1,623 km².

Towns:
 Słupsk
 Ustka
Affluents:

 Bytowa

See also: Rivers of Poland, List of rivers of Europe.

References 

 
Rivers of Poland
Rivers of Pomeranian Voivodeship